Univ (old name to 2003 – Mizhhiria)  – village (selo) which is located in Lviv Raion, Lviv Oblast of Western Ukraine at a distance  from the district center Peremyshliany and  from the regional center of Lviv. It belongs to Peremyshliany urban hromada, one of the hromadas of Ukraine.

The population is about 468 persons  and local government is administered by Korosnenska village council. 

History and Attractions 
This countryside is an owner of one of the greatest Christian shrines in Galicia - Univ Holy Dormition Lavra of the Studite Rite. The first mention in archived documents dated back to 16th century, where the Univ is mentioned as well-known spiritual center of Galicia. Church of the Assumption of the Holy Virgin is a dominant building of a monastery ensemble. There are a Temple of the Ascension of the Lord UGCC in the village Univ.

Until 18 July 2020, Univ belonged to Peremyshliany Raion. The raion was abolished in July 2020 as part of the administrative reform of Ukraine, which reduced the number of raions of Lviv Oblast to seven. The area of Peremyshliany Raion was merged into Lviv Raion.

References

External links 
 Univ 
 weather.in.ua\ Univ
 Село Унів: карта вулиць, фото, опис 
  Замки і храми України – Унів 

Villages in Lviv Raion